National Sports Awards are given by the Ministry of Youth and Sports, Government of Bangladesh for specific contributions in the field of games and sports. The award was introduced in 1976. As of 2011, total 175 sports personalities won the award.

Awards 
The awardees include the organisers of games and sports, and the individuals displaying extraordinary performances in football, hockey, cricket, swimming, shooting, chase, and athletics. Each awardee is entitled to a gold medal and twenty thousand taka in cash. Next the amount of cash was increased to tk 50,000 in May 2017 and now tk 1,00,000 each from November 2019.

Winners

See also
 Sport in Bangladesh

References 

Sport in Bangladesh
Bangladeshi awards
Civil awards and decorations of Bangladesh